Frederick Tyson Jinks (24 November 1880 – 9 February 1940) was an Australian rules footballer who played for Carlton in the Victorian Football League during the early 1900s.

Originally from VFA club Footscray, Jinks was recruited by Carlton in 1906. Although he spent only four seasons with Carlton, he played in a Grand Final each year for three premierships. He played mainly in the ruck but was also used as a half forward flanker. In 1908 he became the club's vice captain and left two years later as a response to the sacking of coach Jack Worrall. He returned to the VFA where he played with North Melbourne, winning a premiership in 1910 and acting as captain-coach in 1912.

References

External links

Blueseum profile

1880 births
Australian rules footballers from Bendigo
Carlton Football Club players
Carlton Football Club Premiership players
North Melbourne Football Club (VFA) players
Footscray Football Club (VFA) players
Eaglehawk Football Club players
1940 deaths
Three-time VFL/AFL Premiership players